August Lambert (18 February 1916 – 17 April 1945) was a German Luftwaffe military aviator and ground-attack pilot during World War II. As a fighter ace, he is credited with 116 aerial victories claimed in approximately 350 combat missions for which he was awarded the Knight's Cross of the Iron Cross, the highest award in the military and paramilitary forces of Nazi Germany during World War II. All of his aerial victories were claimed on the Eastern Front.

Career
Lambert was born on 18 February 1916 in Kleestadt in the Grand Duchy of Hesse. After he joined the Luftwaffe, he was trained as a pilot in 1937/38. Lambert then served as a flight instructor in various training units until 1943.

World War II
World War II in Europe began on Friday 1 September 1939, when German forces invaded Poland. In 1943, Lambert was transferred to II. Gruppe (2nd group) of Schlachtgeschwader 1 (SG 1—1st Ground Assault Wing). As an Oberfeldwebel, he flew his first combat mission on southern sector of the Eastern Front and claimed his first aerial victory on 23 April 1943 was not confirmed. Lambert flew almost 200 ground support missions in which he and the fellow pilots of II./SG 2 accounted for the destruction of hundreds of ground support vehicles and artillery batteries.

II./SG 1 was renamed Schlachtgeschwader 2 "Immelmann" (SG 2—2nd Ground Assault Wing) on 18 October 1943.

II. Gruppe of SG 2 was heavily involved in the Crimean campaign during early-mid 1944, and in addition to its usual ground-attack work flew interception sorties, claiming some 247 Soviet aircraft shot down. On 10 April 1944, he claimed four victories, a Yak-9, a P-39 Airacobra and two Il-2 Sturmoviks. On 17 April 1944, Lambert was credited with twelve aerial victories, including five Il-2 Sturmovik. According to Bergström, this number may be exaggerated according to Soviet records. The Ministry of Aviation (RLM—Reichsluftfahrtministerium) only holds records for five of these claims. He claimed nine further victories on 4 May. On 6 May 1944, Lambert again claimed to have become a "double-ace in a day". These 14 aerial victories over an unknown type were not documented by the RLM.

Leutnant Lambert claimed some 70 aerial victories during one three-week period. He received the Knight's Cross of the Iron Cross on 14 May 1944 and the German Cross in Gold on 1 October 1944. By May 1944, the depleted II./SG 2 retired to bases in Romania.

Following the Battle of the Crimea resulting in the evacuation of the Crimea by the Germans, Lambert served as an instructor with Schlachtgeschwader 151. In March 1945, he was posted to Schlachtgeschwader 77 (SG 77—77th Ground Assault Wing) where he commanded 8. Staffel as Staffelkapitän (squadron leader) and Oberleutnant. In April 1945, Lambert was credited with his 100th aerial victory. He was the 101st Luftwaffe pilot to achieve the century mark.

On the morning of 17 April 1945, Leutnant Gerhard Bauer, Lambert, and another pilot were taking off from Kamenz for a mission to the front when American P-51Ds of the 55th Fighter Group appeared. Bauer's Fw 190 F-9 "Black 1 +" was quickly shot down north of Kuckau, about eight kilometres east-south-east of Kamenz. August Lambert and another 8./Schlachtgeschwader 77 pilot tried desperately to get away, but could not lose their pursuers.

Lambert was officially credited with shooting down 116 enemy aircraft, all claimed on the Eastern Front. He also claimed over 100 vehicles destroyed in ground attacks. After his death, Lambert had been nominated for the Oak Leaves to his Knight's Cross, but this request was not approved.

Summary of career

Aerial victory claims
According to US historian David T. Zabecki, Lambert was credited with 116 aerial victories. Mathews and Foreman, authors of Luftwaffe Aces — Biographies and Victory Claims, researched the German Federal Archives and state that Lambert was credited with 103 aerial victories, all of which claimed on the Eastern Front.

Awards
 Iron Cross (1939) 2nd and 1st class
 Honour Goblet of the Luftwaffe (Ehrenpokal der Luftwaffe) on 17 January 1944 as Oberfeldwebel and pilot
 German Cross in Gold 1 October 1944 as Leutnant in the 5./Schlachtgeschwader 2
 Knight's Cross of the Iron Cross on 14 May 1944 as Leutnant and pilot in the 5./Schlachtgeschwader 2 "Immelmann"
 Mentioned three times in the Wehrmachtbericht

Notes

References

Citations

Bibliography

 
 
 
 
 
 
 
 
 
 
 
 
 
 
 
 

1916 births
1945 deaths
People from Groß-Umstadt
German World War II flying aces
Luftwaffe pilots
People from the Grand Duchy of Hesse
Luftwaffe personnel killed in World War II
Recipients of the Gold German Cross
Recipients of the Knight's Cross of the Iron Cross
Aviators killed by being shot down
Military personnel from Hesse